Aza or AZA may refer to:

Places
Aza, Azerbaijan, a village and municipality
Azadkənd, Nakhchivan or Lower Aza, Azerbaijan
Aza, medieval name of Haza, Province of Burgos, Spain
Aźa, a Tibetan name for the Tuyuhun kingdom
Aza, a Hebrew romanization for Gaza City or Gaza Strip

People
Aza (given name) 
Aza of Mannea, king, reigned c. 710–700 BC
Alejandro De Aza (born 1984), Dominican baseball outfielder
Vital Aza (1851–1912), Spanish author, playwright, poet and satirist

Other uses
Aza (Kanji: 字), a village or town section in the Japanese addressing system
Azelanic acid, an organic acid used for medical treatment of acne and as whitening agent

Abbreviations or initialisms

 Azathioprine, an immunosuppressant medication
 Association of Zoos and Aquariums (formerly named "American Zoo and Aquarium Association")
 Aleph Zadik Aleph, a Jewish youth group that is part of BBYO
 ISO 639-3 aza for Azha language, a language of China
 ICAO code for Alitalia, an Italian airline
 IATA code for Phoenix-Mesa Gateway Airport

See also
 Asa (disambiguation)